Sipke Taeke Castelein (born 14 April 1941) is a retired Dutch rower. He competed at the 1964 Summer Olympics in the coxless fours, together with Jim Enters, Herman Boelen and Sjoerd Wartena, and finished in fourth place. He won a silver medal in the coxed pairs at the 1963 European Championships.

References

External links
 

1941 births
Living people
Dutch male rowers
Olympic rowers of the Netherlands
Rowers at the 1964 Summer Olympics
People from Nijefurd
European Rowing Championships medalists
Sportspeople from Friesland